The 2000 WGC-American Express Championship was a golf tournament that was contested from 9–12 November 2000 at Valderrama Golf Club in Sotogrande, San Roque, Spain. It was the second WGC-American Express Championship tournament, and the third of four World Golf Championships events that year.

Mike Weir won the tournament after he birdied five of his first 11 holes on Sunday.

Field
1. Top 50 from the Official World Golf Ranking as of 30 October
Robert Allenby (2), Stuart Appleby (2), Thomas Bjørn (3), Michael Campbell (3,4), Darren Clarke (3), José Cóceres (3), Ernie Els (2,3), Steve Flesch (2), Carlos Franco (2), Sergio García, Retief Goosen (3), Pádraig Harrington (3), Dudley Hart, Scott Hoch, Miguel Ángel Jiménez (3), Bernhard Langer (3), Justin Leonard (2), Jeff Maggert, Shigeki Maruyama, Bob May (2), Rocco Mediate, Colin Montgomerie (3), José María Olazábal (3), Naomichi Ozaki, Jesper Parnevik (2), Dennis Paulson, Chris Perry (2), Nick Price (2), Eduardo Romero (3), Vijay Singh (2), David Toms (2), Kirk Triplett (2), Scott Verplank (2), Duffy Waldorf, Mike Weir (2), Lee Westwood (3), Tiger Woods (2)

Paul Azinger (2), Notah Begay III (2), Stewart Cink (2), Fred Couples, David Duval (2), Jim Furyk (2), John Huston (2), Tom Lehman (2), Davis Love III (2), Phil Mickelson (2), Greg Norman, Loren Roberts (2), and Hal Sutton (2) did not play.

2. Top 30 on the 2000 PGA Tour money list through the National Car Rental Golf Classic Disney
Mark Calcavecchia, Chris DiMarco, Franklin Langham

3. Top 20 on the 2000 European Tour Order of Merit through the Volvo Masters
Ángel Cabrera, Andrew Coltart, Pierre Fulke, Mathias Grönberg, Paul McGinley, Gary Orr, Phillip Price

4. Top 3 on the 1999–2000 PGA Tour of Australasia Order of Merit
Lucas Parsons, Peter Senior

5. Top 3 on the 1999–2000 Southern Africa Tour Order of Merit
Darren Fichardt, Nic Henning, Tjaart van der Walt

6. Top 3 on the 2000 Japan Golf Tour Order of Merit through the Philip Morris Championship
Nobuhito Sato, Hidemichi Tanaka
Toru Taniguchi did not play.

5. Winner of the 1999 Asian PGA Tour Order of Merit
Kyi Hla Han

Round summaries

First round

Second round

Third round

Final round

External links
Full results

WGC Championship
Golf tournaments in Spain
WGC-American Express Championship
WGC-American Express Championship
WGC-American Express Championship